Ravish may refer to

Ravish Desai, Indian actor and model
Ravish Kumar, Indian TV anchor, writer and journalist 
Ravish Malhotra, Indian air force officer and astronaut
Ravish Siddiqi, Indian Urdu poet

Indian masculine given names